Fabio Balaso (born 20 October 1995) is an Italian volleyball player for Cucine Lube Civitanova and the Italian national team.

He participated at the  2017,  2019 and 2021 Men's European Volleyball Championship.

Sporting achievements

Clubs

CEV Champions League
   2018/2019 – with Cucine Lube Civitanova

FIVB Club World Championship
  Poland 2018 – with Cucine Lube Civitanova
  Betim 2019 – with Cucine Lube Civitanova
  Betim 2021 – with Cucine Lube Civitanova

National championship
 2018/2019  Italian Cup, with Cucine Lube Civitanova
 2018/2019  Italian Championship, with Cucine Lube Civitanova
 2019/2020  Italian Cup, with Cucine Lube Civitanova
 2020/2021  Italian Supercup, with Cucine Lube Civitanova
 2020/2021  Italian Cup, with Cucine Lube Civitanova
 2020/2021  Italian Championship, with Cucine Lube Civitanova

Individual awards 

 2019: FIVB Club World Championship – Best Libero
 2021: Italian Serie A1 – Best Libero
 2021: CEV European Championship – Best Libero
 2021: FIVB Club World Championship – Best Libero
 2022: FIVB World Championship – Best Libero

References

External links
 

1995 births
Living people
Italian men's volleyball players
People from Camposampiero
Competitors at the 2018 Mediterranean Games
Mediterranean Games gold medalists for Italy
Mediterranean Games medalists in volleyball
Sportspeople from the Province of Padua